Dietmar Hinz (born 14 March 1953) is a German former wrestler. He competed in the men's Greco-Roman 48 kg for East Germany at the 1976 Summer Olympics.

References

External links
 

1953 births
Living people
German male sport wrestlers
Olympic wrestlers of East Germany
Wrestlers at the 1976 Summer Olympics
People from Loitz
Sportspeople from Mecklenburg-Western Pomerania
20th-century German people